There have been as many as 48 recessions in the United States dating back to the Articles of Confederation, and although economists and historians dispute certain 19th-century recessions, the consensus view among economists and historians is that "The cyclical volatility of GDP and unemployment was greater before the Great Depression than it has been since the end of World War II." Cycles in the country's agricultural production, industrial production, consumption, business investment, and the health of the banking industry contribute to these declines. U.S. recessions have increasingly affected economies on a worldwide scale, especially as countries' economies become more intertwined.

The unofficial beginning and ending dates of recessions in the United States have been defined by the National Bureau of Economic Research (NBER), an American private nonprofit research organization. The NBER defines a recession as "a significant decline in economic activity spread across the economy, lasting more than two quarters which is 6 months, normally visible in real gross domestic product (GDP), real income, employment, industrial production, and wholesale-retail sales".

In the 19th century, recessions frequently coincided with financial crises. Determining the occurrence of pre-20th-century recessions is more difficult due to the dearth of economic statistics, so scholars rely on historical accounts of economic activity, such as contemporary newspapers or business ledgers. Although the NBER does not date recessions before 1857, economists customarily extrapolate dates of U.S. recessions back to 1790 from business annals based on various contemporary descriptions. Their work is aided by historical patterns, in that recessions often follow external shocks to the economic system such as wars and variations in the weather affecting agriculture, as well as banking crises.

Major modern economic statistics, such as unemployment and GDP, were not compiled on a regular and standardized basis until after World War II. The average duration of the 11 recessions between 1945 and 2001 is 10 months, compared to 18 months for recessions between 1919 and 1945, and 22 months for recessions from 1854 to 1919. Because of the great changes in the economy over the centuries, it is difficult to compare the severity of modern recessions to early recessions. Before the COVID-19 recession began in March 2020, no post-World War II era had come anywhere near the depth of the Great Depression, which lasted from 1929 until 1941 (which included a bull market between 1933 and 1937) and was caused by the 1929 crash of the stock market and other factors.

Early recessions and crises (1785-1836)
Attempts have been made to date recessions in America beginning in 1790. These periods of recession were not identified until the 1920s. To construct the dates, researchers studied business annals during the period and constructed time series of the data. The earliest recessions for which there is the most certainty are those that coincide with major financial crises.

Beginning in 1835, an index of business activity by the Cleveland Trust Company provides data for comparison between recessions. Beginning in 1854, the National Bureau of Economic Research dates recession peaks and troughs to the month. However, a standardized index does not exist for the earliest recessions.

In 1791, Congress chartered the First Bank of the United States to handle the country's financial needs. The bank had some functions of a modern central bank, although it was responsible for only 20% of the young country's currency. In 1811 the bank's charter lapsed, but it was replaced by the Second Bank of the United States, which lasted from 1816 to 1836.

Free Banking Era to the Great Depression (1836-1929)

In the 1830s, U.S. President Andrew Jackson fought to end the Second Bank of the United States. Following the Bank War, the Second Bank lost its charter in 1836. From 1837 to 1862, there was no national presence in banking, but still plenty of state and even local regulation, such as laws against branch banking which prevented diversification. In 1863, in response to financing pressures of the Civil War, Congress passed the National Banking Act, creating nationally chartered banks. There was neither a central bank nor deposit insurance during this era, and thus banking panics were common. Recessions often led to bank panics and financial crises, which in turn worsened the recession.

The dating of recessions during this period is controversial. Modern economic statistics, such as gross domestic product and unemployment, were not gathered during this period. Victor Zarnowitz evaluated a variety of indices to measure the severity of these recessions. From 1834 to 1929, one measure of recessions is the Cleveland Trust Company index, which measured business activity and, beginning in 1882, an index of trade and industrial activity was available, which can be used to compare recessions.

Great Depression onward (1929–present)

Following the end of World War II and the large adjustment as the economy adjusted from wartime to peacetime in 1945, the collection of many economic indicators, such as unemployment and GDP, became standardized. Recessions after World War II may be compared to each other much more easily than previous recessions because of these available data. The listed dates and durations are from the official chronology of the National Bureau of Economic Research. GDP data are from the Bureau of Economic Analysis, unemployment from the Bureau of Labor Statistics (after 1948). The unemployment rate often reaches a peak associated with a recession after the recession has officially ended.

Until the start of the COVID-19 recession in 2020, no post-World War II era came anywhere near the depth of the Great Depression. In the Great Depression, GDP fell by 27% (the deepest after demobilization is the recession beginning in December 2007, during which GDP has fallen 5.1% as of the second quarter of 2009) and unemployment rate reached 10% (the highest since was the 10.8% rate reached during the 1981–1982 recession).

The National Bureau of Economic Research dates recessions on a monthly basis back to 1854; according to their chronology, from 1854 to 1919, there were 16 cycles. The average recession lasted 22 months, and the average expansion 27. From 1919 to 1945, there were six cycles; recessions lasted an average 18 months and expansions for 35. From 1945 to 2001, and 10 cycles, recessions lasted an average 10 months and expansions an average of 57 months. This has prompted some economists to declare that the business cycle has become less severe.

Many factors that may have contributed to this moderation including the establishment of deposit insurance in the form of the Federal Deposit Insurance Corporation in 1933 and increased regulation of the banking sector. Other changes include the use of fiscal policy in the form of automatic stabilizers to alleviate cyclical volatility. The creation of the Federal Reserve System in 1913 has been disputed as a source of stability with it and its policies having mixed successes. Since the early 1980s the sources of the Great Moderation has been attributed to numerous causes including public policy, industry practices, technology, and even good luck.

See also 
 Criticism of the Federal Reserve
 List of economic expansions in the United States
 List of recessions in the United Kingdom
 List of stock market crashes and bear markets

Notes

References

Sources 
 
 
 
 US Business Cycle Expansions and Contractions, National Bureau of Economic Research. Retrieved on September 19, 2009.

External links 
 National Bureau of Economic Research
 Business Cycle Expansions and Contractions (List of NBER Recessions)
 The Three Ds of Recession: A Brief History – see table 1 and chart 1 for a more detailed list of recessions in the US

recessions